Arhaus is an American retail chain that designs and sells home furnishings online and through its retail stores and catalogs. The company is headquartered in Boston Heights, Ohio.

History
Arhaus was founded in 1986 by John Reed and his father, Jack Reed, as a furniture store in The Flats of Cleveland, Ohio. The company name is a portmanteau of the Danish city "Aarhus," and the German word for "house." The Reeds expanded Arhaus that same year, converting four Workbench franchise stores in the Cleveland and Akron, Ohio area into Arhaus storefronts.

In 2013, the company formerly known as Homeworks, Inc. changed  its name to Arhaus, LLC.
 
In 2015, the chain had 57 storefronts in the United States. As of 2017, the chain had 67 storefronts in the United States.
 
In 2014, Freeman Spogli & Co., a private equity firm, acquired a minority stake in Arhaus for an undisclosed amount.
 
In 2016, Arhaus moved its headquarters from Walton Hills, Ohio to Boston Heights, Ohio.

In 2019, Arhaus opened its new flagship location at Legacy Village in Lyndhurst, Ohio.

In 2021 Arhaus became listed on the Nasdaq with an initial public offering that valued the company at $1.75 billion.

Growth 

, Arhaus operates 80 locations across America in 28 states. The company has opened in-mall locations, including anchor stores, as well as freestanding locations as part of open air shopping centers. In 2014, Arhaus opened their first locations in Arizona and California in addition to six other stores. In 2015, Arhaus opened seven new stores, including locations in Louisiana and Kansas, bringing total store count up to 60 by the end of the year. Arhaus opened multiple New York locations in 2016 as well as another location in Texas. In 2017, Arhaus opened its first Alabama and Wisconsin locations as well as another California location, increasing store count to 70.

Products
Arhaus sells home furniture and decor products such as sofas, dining tables and chairs, bedroom furniture, bedding, media centers, tableware, rugs and lighting. The company adapts its storefronts to reflect local markets and influences.
 
According to Arhaus, the company does not source materials from endangered rainforests for its furniture. The company reports that around 50% of its product incorporates recycled materials.
 
Arhaus sells "relics" as a part of their product offering. "Relics" are antiques that have been purchased by the company, refurbished or repurposed, and then are sold off the floor by Arhaus.

References

External links
 

Home decor retailers
American companies established in 1986
Retail companies established in 1986
Furniture retailers of the United States
Companies based in Cleveland
Companies listed on the Nasdaq
1986 establishments in Ohio
2021 initial public offerings